Quinanga of Kongo (c. 1381-c. 1435) was the second ruler or manikongo of the Central African kingdom of Kongo, from the Lukeni kanda dynasty. He was born around 1381 and the dates and events of his reign are not exact, but he ruled from around 1420 to around 1435, when he died.  It is known that he was a cousin of the kingdom's founder, Lukeni lua Nimi.

See also
List of rulers of Kongo
Kingdom of Kongo

References

Kongolese royalty
Manikongo of Kongo
15th-century monarchs in Africa